Tokyo, OK (Formerly Tokyo In Tulsa) is an annual three-day anime convention held during July at the Hyatt Regency Tulsa Downtown in Tulsa, Oklahoma. The convention is family friendly, and along with being an anime convention is Oklahoma's largest game event.

Programming
The convention typically offers anime video rooms, artists’ alley, collectible cards games, concerts, cosplay ball, costume competitions, LARP, panel discussions, rave, tabletop gaming, vendors, and video gaming (console, PC, arcade). In 2015, the convention had 50,000 sq ft of gaming space. In 2017 and 2021, the convention had more than 300 hours of programming.

History
Tokyo In Tulsa began as a Halloween block party held in October 2005 for the Darkstone Anime Store in Tulsa. Attendance was estimated at 500 people. After the store closed in 2006 the event continued. Cassandra Hodges was scheduled to appear as a friend of the convention prior to her death in 2011.

In 2019, Tokyo In Tulsa moved to the Stoney Creek Hotel & Conference Center in Broken Arrow, Oklahoma. This move was due to construction at the Cox Business Center, and the facilities costs. The convention was spread out across five total venues, including a Hilton Garden Inn, XTreme Racing & Entertainment, the Broken Arrow Performing Arts Center, and a former Hobby Lobby. Shuttles were run by the convention  between the venues. The vendor room was moved two weeks before the convention, and had serious issues including a lack of lighting. Tokyo in Tulsa 2020 was cancelled due to the COVID-19 pandemic. 

Tokyo in Tulsa was renamed Tokyo, OK in January 2021. Tokyo, OK 2021 was moved from July to October due to the COVID-19 pandemic and the convention moved to the Hyatt Regency Tulsa Downtown in Tulsa, Oklahoma. Space from the Aloft Tulsa Downtown and Holiday Inn City Center was also utilized. The convention in 2022 continued to be at the Hyatt Regency, but also used space at 17West, Aloft, Courtyard, and Hyatt Place.

Event History

Community support
Tokyo, OK was recognized by the Tulsa Convention and Visitors Bureau and the Tulsa Hotel & Lodging Association in 2009 for its efforts in attracting tourism to the city of Tulsa. Fundraisers ranging from challenges, a photo suite, and a silent auction were held plus a portion of the conventions 2013 revenue went to the charity Bikers Against Child Abuse. In 2014, the Charity Ball, held pre-convention, along with other at convention donations benefited the Greenwood Cultural Center's Kids Korner. The 2021 ball benefited the Youth Services of Tulsa.

References

External links
 Tokyo, OK Website

Anime conventions in the United States
Recurring events established in 2008
2008 establishments in Oklahoma
Annual events in Oklahoma
Festivals in Oklahoma
Culture of Tulsa, Oklahoma
Tourist attractions in Tulsa, Oklahoma
Conventions in Oklahoma